Doğucan Haspolat (born 11 February 2000) is a professional footballer who plays for as a midfielder for Turkish club Trabzonspor. Born in the Netherlands, he represents Turkey internationally.

Club career
Haspolat is a youth exponent from Excelsior. He made his professional debut on 27 August 2016 in an Eredivisie game against Feyenoord Rotterdam replacing Kevin Vermeulen after 70 minutes and becoming the first player from 2000 who played in the Eredevisie. He transferred to the Süper Lig club Kasımpaşa on 20 January 2020, signing a 3.5 year contract. On 17 July 2022, he transferred to Trabzonspor on a 3-year contract.

International career
Haspolat was born in the Netherlands, and is of Turkish descent. He is a former youth international for the Netherlands, before switching to represent Turkey.

Honours
Trabzonspor
 Turkish Super Cup: 2022

References

External links
 

2000 births
Living people
Footballers from Rotterdam
Association football midfielders
Turkish footballers
Turkey under-21 international footballers
Dutch footballers
Netherlands youth international footballers
Dutch people of Turkish descent
Excelsior Rotterdam players
Kasımpaşa S.K. footballers
Trabzonspor footballers
Eredivisie players
Eerste Divisie players
Süper Lig players